Club Sportive Duguwolofila de Koulikoro is a Malian football club. The team is based in the city of Koulikoro.

History

Achievements
 Malien Première Division: 

 Malien Cup: 

 Mali Super Cup:

Squad

References
 https://web.archive.org/web/20141221083223/http://www.footmali.com/ (Le football au Mali)

Football clubs in Mali
Koulikoro